Deh Seyd-e Kesht Varzeh (also Romanized as Deh Şeyd-e Kesht Varzeh; also known as Deh Şeydāl-e Kesht Varzeh, Kesht-e Varzah, and Şeydālābād) is a village in Zaz-e Sharqi Rural District, Zaz va Mahru District, Aligudarz County, Lorestan Province, Iran. At the 2006 census, its population was 40, in 6 families.

References 

Towns and villages in Aligudarz County